K-18 is a , west–east state highway in the U.S. State of Kansas. K-18's western terminus is at U.S. Route 24 (US-24) near Bogue and the eastern terminus is at K-99 south of Wamego. Portions of the highway have been upgraded to a freeway beginning in 2012.

K-18 from US-81 to the western boundary of Lincoln County has been designated "Medal of Honor Recipient Donald K. Ross Memorial Highway".

Route description

K-18 begins near the town of Bogue in Graham County as it branches off to the south from US-24. As K-18 enters Ottawa County, it takes a due east bearing, traveling through Tescott and meeting US-81 north of Salina. The road briefly jogs to the north for around  before turning east again to travel through Bennington and Talmage in Dickinson County and into Junction City in Geary County. In Junction City, K-18 meets US-77 and travels south along US-77 through the city until it hits I-70. K-18 then travels to the northeast along I-70 for eight miles (13 km) before exiting and continuing to the northeast toward Manhattan as a freeway. K-18 crosses the Kansas River at the Riley County line and travels through Ogden into Manhattan. Once traveling through Manhattan, K-18 again crosses the Kansas River and parallels the river to the south into Wabaunsee County before ending at K-99 south of Wamego.

The section of K-18 from just east of the interchange with K-113 to K-177 within Manhattan is maintained by the city.

History

K-18 was first designated as a state highway in 1926, and ran from US-40 (now US-24) to US-81 north of Salina. In 1936, it extended to US-77 in Junction City. In 1953, it extended to K-13. In 1960, it extended east over cancelled K-29 to K-99.

Realignments
In a November 23, 1955 resolution, a  spur route of K-18 was built on the western side of Manhattan. Then in a November 14, 1956 resolution, the new alignment of K-18 was to be built from the western end of the spur westward.

In a resolution on May 9, 1973, it was approved to realign K-18 onto I-70 and US-40, which removed the overlap between K-18 and K-57. The former section of K-18 from Ogden northeast to the new K-18 was redesignated as K-114. K-114 was proposed to remove K-18 from its course through Fort Riley in favor of a route around the military base between Ogden and Junction City to separate military traffic and regular highway traffic. K-18 would be placed on its present corridor from just east of Ogden south to I-70, and the piece of K-18 between the city of Ogden and the new portion of K-18 would become K-114. The junction of K-18 and K-114 would be a partial interchange featuring a flyover ramp for westbound K-18 and no access from K-114 to westbound K-18 or from eastbound K-18 to K-114. K-114 was established when construction on the K-18 link between Ogden and I-70 was completed between 1975 and 1977. Between 2010 and 2013, K-18 and K-114 were relocated and their present interchange was constructed.

The section of K-18 from I-70 in Grandview Plaza to K-113 in Manhattan has been rebuilt into a limited-access divided freeway, a project that began in 2012.

On April 5, 2017, work began to convert the interchange with K-113 in Manhattan into a diverging diamond interchange. The $2.587 million project (equivalent to $ in ), completed by Amino Brothers Co. Inc. out of Kansas City, was completed and open to traffic in December 2017.

Junction list

See also

 List of state highways in Kansas

References

External links

018
Transportation in Graham County, Kansas
Transportation in Rooks County, Kansas
Transportation in Osborne County, Kansas
Transportation in Russell County, Kansas
Transportation in Lincoln County, Kansas
Transportation in Ottawa County, Kansas
Transportation in Dickinson County, Kansas
Transportation in Geary County, Kansas
Transportation in Riley County, Kansas
Transportation in Wabaunsee County, Kansas